André Rossi (16 May 1921, Menton – 22 August 1994, Paris) was a French politician. He was France's Minister of Foreign Trade from 25 August 1976 to 31 March 1978, Mayor of Château-Thierry of 1971 to 1989, and Deputy of Aisne from 1958 to 1981, and 1986 to 1994, then Secretary of State, government spokesman from 28 May 1974 to 25 August 1976, before becoming Minister of the Foreign trade.

He was a member of Republican Centre, then a vice-president of Radical Party Valoisien. After his death in 1994, his substitute, Renaud Dutreil succeeded him as deputy.

References

1921 births
1994 deaths
People from Menton
Politicians from Provence-Alpes-Côte d'Azur
Radical Party (France) politicians
Union for French Democracy politicians
Deputies of the 1st National Assembly of the French Fifth Republic
Deputies of the 2nd National Assembly of the French Fifth Republic
Deputies of the 3rd National Assembly of the French Fifth Republic
Deputies of the 4th National Assembly of the French Fifth Republic
Deputies of the 5th National Assembly of the French Fifth Republic
Deputies of the 6th National Assembly of the French Fifth Republic
Deputies of the 8th National Assembly of the French Fifth Republic
Deputies of the 9th National Assembly of the French Fifth Republic
Deputies of the 10th National Assembly of the French Fifth Republic
Mayors of places in Hauts-de-France